Gonzalo Miguel Romero López (born 9 September 1992) is a professional roller hockey player who plays for Sporting CP.

References

1992 births
Living people
Argentine roller hockey players
Sporting CP roller hockey players